Aristotelia ouedella is a moth of the family Gelechiidae. It was described by Pierre Chrétien in 1908. It is found in Algeria.

References

Moths described in 1908
Aristotelia (moth)
Moths of Africa